Jedox is an Enterprise Performance Management software which is used for planning, analytics and reporting in finance and other areas such as sales, human resources and procurement. Its core is a cell-oriented, multi-dimensional in-memory OLAP database that has been especially designed for budgeting and forecasting, and data consolidation. The software has a modular Software as a Service platform. It uses Microsoft Excel as its user interface and a Jedox-specific spreadsheet, both browser independent. Jedox is developed by the software provider of the same name (Jedox GmbH).

Field of use and circulation 
Jedox has been developed for planning, analysis, reporting and data consolidation tasks and may be used in all industries and departments. Jedox extracts the required operational data from the downstream systems, converts it into an analyzable form and makes it available to various user groups through need-based evaluations or access options in multiple front-ends.

It is the most salient feature of the software that apart from covering Business Intelligence applications, e.g. OLAP analyses and retrospective reports, it also includes the option to meet Performance Management needs, such as what–if analyses, demand planning, simulation, budgeting, financial planning, and balanced scorecards.

Jedox is used in approximately 140 countries and is shipped in 26 languages. Organizations that have used Jedox to build Business Intelligence and Performance Management applications are, among others, Metro Group, the German Federation of Chambers of Commerce (DIHK) and Swissport.

License Packages 
The company offers its software suite in rental models. The rental models give customers the choice of a cloud-based or an on-premises model. Operation is possible through Microsoft Azure Cloud Services in form of a Software as a Service offering. In addition, Jedox offers a free of charge 14-day cloud trial.

Company 
The company was founded in Freiburg im Breisgau, Germany, in 2002 by Kristian Raue. Since 2008, Jedox has been a stock corporation. Effective October 2018 Florian Winterstein has been appointed as Chief Executive Officer (CEO).

The company has acquired German software company Reboard, a provider for advanced analytics and mobile reporting, in December 2014. 
The headquarters of Jedox has been in Freiburg im Breisgau, Germany, since the foundation of the company. Other branch offices are located in Frankfurt/Main, Düsseldorf, and Paris. Jedox announced the opening of a new subsidiary and branch office in Boston in July 2015 . In the same month, the acquisition of Australian software company Naked Data was disclosed, which resulted in the opening of new Jedox branch offices in Singapore, Sydney and Melbourne. In February 2020, an additional office has been established in the USA in Seattle.

See also 
 MOLAP
 Business intelligence
 Performance management
 Comparison of OLAP servers

References

Additional sources 
 Bernd Held, Hartmut Erb: Advanced Controlling mit Excel. Unternehmenssteuerung mit OLAP und PALO, m. CD-ROM., Franzis, Poing 2006,  (in German)
 Stefan Müller, Leif Mergener: Business Intelligence im Vertrieb auf Basis von Open-Source-Lösungen. In: Ronald Gleich, Andreas Klein (Hrsg.): Marketing- und Vertriebs-Controlling (Der Controlling-Berater Bd. 11). Haufe-Lexware, Freiburg 2010, . (in German)
 Online Knowledgebase Free Online Knowledgebase with full-text search and export as PDF functionality
 Feature Voting Tool Feedback/Feature Voting Tool
 b-eye network article - Open Source OLAP in the Retail Environment. John Hobson, February 2008

Business intelligence companies
Online analytical processing
Extract, transform, load tools
Business intelligence software
Data visualization software